The Mangral are a Muslim tribe, found in Azad Kashmir, Pakistan.

They claim to be descended from Raja Mangarpal, a Raja (Prince). Raja Mangarpal emigrated from present day Sialkot to Rajauri in what is now Jammu and Kashmir state. His descendants settled there and Kotli Mangralan became a bustling town. His grandson Raja Sehnse Pal converted to Islam and the town of Sehnsa is named after him. The Mangarpals or Mangran have also emigrated from Kashmir to other far corners of the world.

See also
 Mangral

Social groups of Pakistan